Who's da Killer? is the second album by TRU. It was released in 1993 through In-a-Minute Records and was produced by Master P, E-A-Ski, Charles, CMT and Spoonie. Tobin "TC" Costen's label, Me & Mine Entertainment, re-released the album for No Limit Records in 1998.

Track listing

References

1993 albums
TRU (group) albums
No Limit Records albums